Jim Rockefeller created the Rockefeller Yankee, a fiberglass bodied production sports car in 1951. The first was sold at the 1953 Auto Show in Madison Square Garden. He  had a lifelong passion for science and mechanics. He used his knowledge not only to teach others, but to build and reconstruct several houses in Florida, where he retired.

Sources
http://www.inventorpat.com/yankee.htm
http://www.forgottenfiberglass.com/fiberglass-car-marques/rockefeller-yankee/the-rockefeller-yankee-poor-mans-porsche-motorsport-may-june-1953/

American inventors
2007 deaths
Year of birth missing